This is a list of  in Japan. According to the National Archives of Japan, "archives are one of the three key pillars of culture, together with libraries and museums".

Background
Archive-like facilities and repositories for official documents known as  existed in the Asuka period, while the Shōsōin's holdings include over 11,000 . Further prefectural archives followed in Saitama, Tōkyō, and Kyōto in the 1960s, and in 1971 the National Archives were established. By the end of the 1970s there were fifteen archives at the national, prefectural, and city levels. Entering into force in June the following year, the first of its seven articles stresses the "importance of preserving and providing for use public records and archives as historical materials." Nevertheless, recent municipal mergers and dissolutions have occasioned concerns about the loss of municipal records.

== National Archives ==

Prefectural Archives

Municipal Archives 

 Kobe City Archives
 Nagoya City Archives
 Yokohama Archives of History

See also
 List of museums in Japan
 List of libraries in Japan
 Cultural Property (Japan)

References

External links
  

Archives in Japan
Lists of buildings and structures in Japan
Japan
Archives
Archives